Adult Mom is an indie rock band founded by musician Stevie Knipe. Initially a solo project, Adult Mom has now expanded into a full band including guitarist Allegra Eidinger and drummer Olivia Battell. They have released three full-length albums and multiple EPs, most recently 2021’s Driver on Epitaph Records.

Career
Adult Mom began in 2012 in Stevie Knipe's bedroom, where they recorded an EP and released on Bandcamp titled Bedroom Recordings. Knipe attended State University of New York at Purchase, where they studied anthropology and began writing music. The following year, Knipe released two EP's, one titled bstmommy and the other titled "Mom's Day".

In August 2014, Knipe released a mini-album titled i fell in love by accident. In July 2014, Knipe released another EP titled Sometimes Bad Happens. The EP was listed at number four on Rolling Stone's "10 Best Cassettes of 2014" list. Adult Mom was also part of a split alongside Cyberbully Mom Club and i tried to run away when i was 6. In 2015, Knipe released their first album on Tiny Engines titled Momentary Lapse of Happily.

On May 19, 2017, Adult Mom released their second album, entitled Soft Spots, with label Tiny Engines.

On November 9, 2019, Knipe published a series of tweets accusing Tiny Engines of withholding three years of royalty payments. Tiny Engines ultimately repaid them and subsequently agreed to return the masters for both records released by the label.

Their third full-length album Driver, which was produced by Stevie Knipe and Kyle Pulley at Headroom Studios in Philadelphia, was announced for release on March 5, 2021 via Epitaph Records. It received a rating of 7.3 from Pitchfork.

In March, 2021, Adult Mom was featured in Guitar World Magazine, in which Stevie Knipe and Allegra Eidinger "discuss driving forward with intention and welcoming their pop sensibilities".

Personal life
Knipe identifies as genderqueer, as mentioned in several of their songs, such as "Survival." They cite Alanis Morissette, The Cranberries, Rilo Kiley, and Bright Eyes as musical influences. Their early musical interests also include The Jonas Brothers, Britney Spears, and The Spice Girls. Knipe started playing the guitar when they were fifteen.

Band members 
 Stevie Knipe - Songwriting/guitar/vocals
 Olivia Battell - Drums
 Allegra Eidinger - Lead Guitar

Discography
Albums
Momentary Lapse of Happily (2015, Tiny Engines)
Soft Spots (2017, Tiny Engines)
Driver (2021, Epitaph)
EPs
bedroom recordings (2012)
i fell in love by accident (2013)
bstmommy (2013)
mom's day (2013)
Sometimes Bad Happens (2014)

See also
 LGBT culture in New York City
 List of LGBT people from New York City

References

Musicians from New York (state)
2012 establishments in New York (state)
People with non-binary gender identities
Non-binary musicians
Living people
Year of birth missing (living people)
21st-century LGBT people
Tiny Engines artists